Adriers is a commune in the Vienne department in the Nouvelle-Aquitaine region in western France.

Population

See also
Communes of the Vienne department

References

External links
 Official Site

Communes of Vienne